Roses in the Snow is the seventh album by country music artist Emmylou Harris, released in 1980.  While Harris' previous release, 1979's Blue Kentucky Girl, featured traditional, straight-ahead country (as opposed to the country-rock of her prior efforts), Roses in the Snow found Harris performing bluegrass-inspired music, with material by Flatt and Scruggs, Paul Simon, The Carter Family, and Johnny Cash. Cash, Dolly Parton, Linda Ronstadt, The Whites, Ricky Skaggs, Willie Nelson and Tony Rice made guest appearances. "Wayfaring Stranger" was released as the first single in 1980 and went to #7 on the Billboard Country charts. The second single, a remake of a Simon & Garfunkel song, "The Boxer", reached #13. Backing musicians included Albert Lee and Jerry Douglas.

Track listing

Personnel
Brian Ahern – 12-string guitar, Adamas guitar, Archtop guitar, gut-string guitar, bass, percussion
Bryan Bowers – autoharp
Johnny Cash – backing vocals
Hank DeVito – pedal steel guitar
Jerry Douglas – dobro
Steve Fishell – pedal steel guitar
Emory Gordy Jr. – bass
Emmylou Harris – vocals, acoustic guitar
Albert Lee – electric guitar, Mandolin
Willie Nelson – gut-string guitar
Dolly Parton – backing vocals
Tony Rice – acoustic guitar, backing vocals
Linda Ronstadt – duet vocals, backing vocals
Ricky Skaggs – acoustic guitar, banjo, fiddle, mandolin, duet vocals, backing vocals
John Ware – percussion
Buck White – piano, backing vocals
Cheryl White – backing vocals
Sharon White – backing vocals

Technical
Brian Ahern – producer, engineer
Donivan Cowart – engineer
Stuart Taylor – engineer

Charts

References

 Emmylou Harris Roses in the Snow liner notes

Emmylou Harris albums
1980 albums
Albums produced by Brian Ahern (producer)
Warner Records albums